Conus kermadecensis, common name the Kermadec cone, is a species of sea snail, a marine gastropod mollusk in the family Conidae, the cone snails and their allies.

Like all species within the genus Conus, these snails are predatory and venomous. They are capable of "stinging" humans, therefore live ones should be handled carefully or not at all.

Description
The size of the shell varies between 25 mm and 60 mm.

Distribution
This marine species is endemic to New Zealand, occurring off the Kermadec Islands.

References

 Iredale, T. (1912). New generic names and new species of marine Mollusca. Proceedings of the Malacological Society of London. 10(3): 217–228, pl. 9 page(s): 227, pl. 9 figs 15–16
 Tucker J.K. & Tenorio M.J. (2013) Illustrated catalog of the living cone shells. 517 pp. Wellington, Florida: MdM Publishing.
 Puillandre N., Duda T.F., Meyer C., Olivera B.M. & Bouchet P. (2015). One, four or 100 genera? A new classification of the cone snails. Journal of Molluscan Studies. 81: 1–23

External links
 The Conus Biodiversity website
 Cone Shells – Knights of the Sea
 

kermadecensis
Gastropods described in 1912